Liparis zonatus is a fish from the genus Liparis. It may be found in the Northwest Pacific Ocean in the Yellow Sea, Dalian, and south Liao Dong Wan. The fish's depth ranges from 58 to 910 meters.

References

Liparis (fish)
Fish described in 2004
Taxa named by Anatoly Andriyashev